Rameshk Rural District is a rural district (dehestan) in Chah Dadkhoda District, Qaleh Ganj County, Kerman Province, Iran. At the 2006 census, its population was 8,957, in 2,016 families. The rural district has 47 villages.

References 

Rural Districts of Kerman Province
Qaleh Ganj County